The 2013 Catalunya GP2 Series round was a GP2 Series motor race held at the Circuit de Catalunya in Montmeló, Spain on 11 and 12 May 2012 as the fourth round of the 2013 GP2 Series season. The race was used to support the 2013 Spanish Grand Prix.

Robin Frijns took his—and team Hilmer Motorsports'—maiden GP2 Series victory in the feature race, ahead of Felipe Nasr. Stefano Coletti took his second race win of the season in the sprint race, beating Frijns by six-tenths of a second and further secured his championship lead with the result.

Classification

Qualifying

Feature race

Notes:
 — Jolyon Palmer finished the race in third place, but had twenty seconds added to his race time in lieu of a drive-through penalty after he was judged to have forced Sam Bird off the circuit late in the race.
 — Sam Bird retired from the race, but was classified as a finisher as he had completed over 90% of the winner's race distance.

Sprint race

Notes:
 — Sam Bird was given a five-place grid penalty for causing an avoidable collision with Marcus Ericsson during the feature race.
 — Nathanaël Berthon was given a ten-place grid penalty for causing an avoidable collision with Sergio Canamasas and Tom Dillmann during the feature race.
 — Julián Leal retired from the race, but was classified as a finisher as he had completed over 90% of the winner's race distance.

Standings after the round

Drivers' Championship standings

Teams' Championship standings

 Note: Only the top five positions are included for both sets of standings.

See also 
 2013 Spanish Grand Prix
 2013 Catalunya GP3 Series round

References

Catalunya
Catalunya